Oseberg Transport System (OTS) is a pipeline system in western Norway. The operation of the pipeline was commenced in 1988. Total investment in the pipeline construction was about 9.8 billion NOK.

Technical features
The pipeline is placed in a tunnel close to the coast line. Operating life is expected to be nearly 40 years

Ownership
The OTS is operated by Statoil and includes other licensees

See also

Oseberg oil field
Grane oil field
Sture terminal
North Sea oil

References

External links
Norsk Hydro official site
Statoil official site

Energy infrastructure completed in 1988
Oil pipelines in Norway
North Sea energy
Norsk Hydro
1988 establishments in Norway